Bomberman, known in Japan as , is a video game developed by Hudson Soft for the PlayStation Portable handheld console. It was released in Japan in July 2006, in North America in September 2006, and in the PAL regions in February 2007. It was initially released as simply Bomberman outside Japan, but later released in North America as Bomberman Legacy.

Gameplay
Players must navigate a series of levels, defeating enemies by blowing them up with Bomberman's infinite supply of bombs. Unlike previous games, power-ups are added to an inventory to be used when the player wishes, rather than activated immediately upon collection. Power-ups in the player's inventory are carried over should the player lose a life, but those which have been used have their effects canceled. A total of 18 different power-ups are available in the game.

Reception

The game received above-average reviews according to the review aggregation website Metacritic. In Japan, Famitsu gave it a score of two sevens and two sixes for a total of 26 out of 40.

References

External links
Bomberman Portable at the PlayStation website
Konami Website on Bomberman (PSP)

2006 video games
Bomberman
Hudson Soft games
Konami games
Multiplayer and single-player video games
PlayStation Portable games
PlayStation Portable-only games
Strategy video games
Video games scored by Hideki Sakamoto
Video games developed in Japan